Micrurus diana, also known commonly as  Diana's coral snake, is a species of venomous snake in the family Elapidae. The species is native to South America.

Etymology
The specific name, diana, is dedicated to the goddess Diana.

Geographic range
Specimens of M. diana have been identified in Bolivia (Tucavaca Valley Municipal Reserve) and Brazil (Mato Grosso).

Habitat

Description
M. diana has a color pattern of red, white, and black rings, which are arranged in triads. The snout and chin are white.

Reproduction
M. diana is oviparous.

References

Further reading
Harvey MB, Aparicio J, Gonzales L (2003). "Revision of the venomous snakes of Bolivia: Part 1. The coralsnakes (Elapidae: Micrurus). Annals of Carnegie Museum 72: 1–52.
Pires MG, Feitosa DT, Prudente ALC, Silva NJ Jr (2013). "First record of Micrurus diana Roze, 1983 (Serpentes: Elapidae) for Brazil and extension of its distribution in Bolivia, with notes on morphological variation". Check List 9 (6): 1556–1560.
Roze JA (1983). "New World coral snakes (Elapidae): a taxonomic and biological summary ". Memórias do Instituto Butantan 46: 305–338. (Micrurus frontalis diana, new subspecies).
Roze JA (1994). "Notes on taxonomy of venomous coral snakes (Elapidae) of South America". Bulletin of the Maryland Herpetological Society 30: 177–185. (Micrurus diana, new status).

diana
Snakes of South America
Reptiles of Bolivia
Reptiles of Brazil
Reptiles described in 1983